Sameba may refer to:

 Holy Trinity Cathedral of Tbilisi
 Sameba, Georgia, a village on Madatapa Lake